The Central Arnhem Road, also referred to as the Central Arnhem Highway or locally as "The Track", is a designated state route in the Northern Territory of Australia linking the Stuart Highway to the town of Nhulunbuy on the Gove Peninsula and communities across the East Arnhem region. It connects over 12,000 residents and is a key tourism drive and freight route for the mining and pastoral industries. 

The route traverses through Aboriginal Land and passes through the Aboriginal communities of Barunga, Beswick and Bulman. A free permit from the Northern Land Council is required for non-indigenous persons to travel its length.

Australian 4WD Action ranked the drive 5th in its list of 20 "must drive" four-wheel drive tracks in Australia in 2010.

Present conditions 
The vast majority of the road is unsealed and is prone to seasonal (December - April) flooding, resulting in frequent road restrictions for heavy vehicles and infrequent closures. Due to road conditions, four-wheel drive vehicles are recommended and caravans and camping trailers should be heavy duty. The condition of the road is highly variable, with conditions dependent on the time of year and the road maintenance schedule. Mud, river crossings, loose gravel, corrugations and bulldust are some of the road conditions subject to change of weather conditions.

Fuel 
Fuel is available at three locations along the route: the community of Beswick,  from the junction with the Stuart Highway; the Mainoru Store,  from the junction with the Stuart Highway; and the community of Bulman,  from the junction with the Stuart Highway. Carrying extra fuel is recommended.

Telecommunications 
Telstra service is available when passing through the Aboriginal communities of Barunga, Beswick and Bulman and at locations marked with blue signposts along the route.

Upgrades

River crossing upgrades 
In 2014, a regional roads funding package was announced by the Australian Government which included $7.7 million for upgrades to the Donydji, Goyder and Mainoru River crossings, as well as allocation from the $90 million Northern Territory Roads Productivity Package for the construction of a bridge over Rocky Bottom Creek.

Central Arnhem Road Corridor upgrades 
Under the National Partnership Agreement on Land Transport (NPALT), the Australian Government has committed $180 million and the Northern Territory Government has committed $50 million to contribute to sealing, reconstructing, widening, and flood immunity improvements to priority sections of the route to a fit-for-purpose standard. These works are expected to see 25-35% of the road sealed to a dual lane standard and are expected to occur over the next five to ten years from 2019.

The Federal Budget 2022-2023 released on 25 October 2022 has committed $350 million of additional funding to continue the work of sealing the Tanami Road and Central Arnhem Road.

Future upgrades 
Nhulunbuy remains the only large regional centre in the Northern Territory not connected to the National Highway network via a sealed road. The Northern Territory Government is currently planning to seal the entire length of the Central Arnhem Road to a dual-lane standard which is expected to unlock the economic potential of the region and open up a range of new long term economic and social opportunities. This will be achieved through reduced transit times, improved reliability of supply chains, safer road conditions, and overall improved accessibility in the region. It is also expected to enhance liveability and improve social outcomes by improving access to health and educational services, facilitating social and cultural connections and reducing barriers to development, including operating costs for business.

Major intersections

See also

 Highways in Australia
 List of highways in the Northern Territory

References

Roads in the Northern Territory
Arnhem Land